This is a list of people who have served as Lord Lieutenant of Leicestershire. Since 1703, all Lord Lieutenants have also been Custos Rotulorum of Leicestershire.

Lord Lieutenants

Henry Grey, 3rd Marquess of Dorset 1549–1551
Francis Hastings, 2nd Earl of Huntingdon 1551–1552
Henry Grey, 1st Duke of Suffolk 1552–1554
Francis Hastings, 2nd Earl of Huntingdon 1554 – 20 June 1561 jointly with
Henry Hastings, 3rd Earl of Huntingdon 1559 – 14 December 1595
George Hastings, 4th Earl of Huntingdon 2 October 1596 – 30 December 1604
vacant
Henry Hastings, 5th Earl of Huntingdon 16 May 1607 – 1642 jointly with
Ferdinando Hastings, 6th Earl of Huntingdon 27 December 1638 – 1642
Henry Grey, 1st Earl of Stamford 1642–? (Parliamentary)
Interregnum
Henry Hastings, 1st Baron Loughborough 14 January 1661 – 10 January 1667
John Manners, 8th Earl of Rutland 14 February 1667 – 7 July 1677
John Manners, 9th Earl of Rutland 7 July 1677 – 11 August 1687
Theophilus Hastings, 7th Earl of Huntingdon 11 August 1687 – 6 April 1689
John Manners, 9th Earl of Rutland 6 April 1689 – 24 March 1703
Basil Feilding, 4th Earl of Denbigh 24 March 1703 – 1 July 1706
John Manners, 1st Duke of Rutland 1 July 1706 – 10 January 1711
Basil Feilding, 4th Earl of Denbigh 8 September 1711 – 3 December 1714
John Manners, 2nd Duke of Rutland 3 December 1714 – 22 February 1721
John Manners, 3rd Duke of Rutland 26 April 1721 – 29 May 1779
Charles Manners, 4th Duke of Rutland 16 July 1779 – 24 October 1787
Henry Somerset, 5th Duke of Beaufort 14 December 1787 – 21 October 1799
John Manners, 5th Duke of Rutland 21 October 1799 – 20 January 1857
Charles Manners, 6th Duke of Rutland 13 February 1857 – 3 March 1888
Richard William Penn Curzon-Howe, 3rd Earl Howe 19 June 1888 – 25 September 1900
Henry Manners, 8th Duke of Rutland 7 November 1900 – 8 May 1925
Arthur Grey Hazlerigg, 1st Baron Hazlerigg 27 July 1925 – 25 May 1949
Robert Godfrey Wolseley Bewicke-Copley, 5th Baron Cromwell 2 August 1949 – 21 October 1966
Col. Sir Robert Andrew St George Martin, KCVO 5 April 1966 – 24 April 1989
Sir Timothy Gerald Martin Brooks, KCVO 24 April 1989 – 24 February 2003
Jennifer, Lady Gretton JP 24 February 2003 – 14 June 2018
Mike Kapur  14 June 2018 – present

Deputy Lieutenants

Active List as of April 2016 
 Ramanbahai C Barber Esq MBE DL June, 2013
 Gautam Govindlal Bodiwala Esq CBE JP DL 2001
 Richard L Brucciani Esq OBE DL 1999
 Professor Sir Robert Burgess DL 2010
 Baroness Hazel Byford DBE DL 2010
 Robert Bruce Collins Esq MVO DL 2006
 Colonel Raeburn Murray Longair Colville TD DL 1997
 Miss Rosemary Jean N Conley CBE DL 1999
 Gerrard Amaury A March Phillips de Lisle Esq DL 1997
 Richard Anthony Spencer Everard Esq OBE DL 1997
 Andrew James Granger Esq DL 2008
 Brigadier William James Hurrell CBE DL 2008
 Col Richard Sells Hurwood DL 2006
 Mrs Freda Hussain MBE DL 2006
 David John Knowles Esq DL 1999
 Sir Michael Latham DL
 Dr Angela Isabel Agnes Lennox CBE DL 2001
 Mrs Elizabeth Jane Martin DL June, 2013
 Colonel Robert C J Martin OBE DL 2010
 Ian Malcolm McAlpine Esq OBE DL 2001
 Suleman Nagdi Esq MBE DL 2008
 Hugh Michael Pearson Esq DL 2008
 Professor Sir Nilesh J Samani DL 2010
 Resham Singh Sandhu Esq MBE DL 2006
 Wendi Kathleen Stevens DL 2008
 Bridget Ellen Towle CBE DL  June, 2013
 Peter John Wheeler Esq JP DL 2001
 David William Wilson Esq CBE DL 2008
 David John Wyrko Esq QPM DL 2010
 Mr Jonathan Agnew 2015
 Mr Dave Andrews  2015
 Mrs Sally Bowie 2015
 Mr Mike Kapur Esq 2015
 Mr David Lindley QPM 2015
 Mr Riaz Ravat BEM 2015
 Mrs Elisabeth Turnbull 2015
 Professor David Wilson 2015

Added 2017:
 Mr Richard Allan Halford BROOKS 2017
 Mr Richard Charles Griffin CLOWES 2017
 Ms Mehmooda DUKE 2017
 Mr Priyesh PATEL MBE 2017
 Professor Surinder Mohan SHARMA 2017
 Lieutenant Colonel David Richard James Young TD DL 2018

Previous Deputy Lieutenants

Ernest Clive Atkins
John Cridlan Barrett
Edwyn Burnaby
Thomas Cave
John Coke
Edwin de Lisle
John de Lisle
Sir William Farrell-Skeffington
Washington Shirley, 8th Earl Ferrers
Washington Shirley, 9th Earl Ferrers
Charles Freer, 1862
John Frewen-Turner
John Gretton, 3rd Baron Gretton
John Dove Harris
Sir Thomas Kennedy
Sir Maurice Levy, 1st Baronet
Sir Edward Packe
Eben William Robertson
George Murray Smith the Younger
Samuel Francis Stone, Esq. March 1901 
Robert Tilney

References

External links
History of the Office of the Lord-Lieutenant

Leicestershire
History of Leicestershire
Lord lieutenant
People from Leicestershire